The Greenville County Museum of Art (GCMA) is an art museum located in Greenville, South Carolina.  Its collections focus mainly on American art, and its holdings include works by Andrew Wyeth, Josef Albers, Jasper Johns (raised in South Carolina), Andy Warhol, Romare Bearden, Jacob Lawrence, Ronnie Landfield, Helen Turner, Mary Tannahill, Eric Fischl, Marylyn Dintenfass, and Leon Golub.  Southern American and South Carolina-based artists, such as Henrietta Johnston, are also represented.

History
In 1963, the South Carolina General Assembly established the Greenville County Museum Commission. The art association acquired its first permanent home with the purchase of the Gassaway Mansion in 1958. In 1974 GCMA moved into its modernist building. The new building is almost 90,000 square feet for spacious exhibition galleries, a museum shop, art storage, a 190-seat auditorium, and classrooms for studio instruction. In 1973 the American Association of Museums accredited GCMA and renewed accreditation in 1986 and 1998. In 1985, the Museum refined its collections policy to focus on creating a comprehensive survey of American art using southern related examples. In 1995 the GCMA published a book, The Southern Collection, which includes 126 essays about 146 different works in the collection. The Greenville County Museum of Art is one of 55 museums in South Carolina fully accredited by the Alliance of American Museums, a rigorous benchmark. The American Alliance of Museums awarded accreditation to the Museum first in 1973 and subsequently renewed accreditation in 1986, 1998, and 2009.

Exhibitions and collections
The museum is nationally known for three collections: the Southern Collection, a survey of American art using southern-related examples; Andrew Wyeth: The Greenville Collection; and a collection of contemporary art unrivaled in the state. 

The museum's “Southern Collection” explores the breadth of American art and history through the Southern experience from the colonial era to the present. Among the highlights are a group of pre-Civil War vessels created by African-American potter and poet David Drake, a collection of American Impressionism, and an array of works by 20th-century masters like Georgia O’Keeffe, Romare Bearden, and Andy Warhol. The GCMA is home to an important collection of modernist works by South Carolina native African-American artist William H. Johnson. The museum boasts individual works by such twentieth-century masters as George Bellows, Georgia O’Keeffe, Josef Albers, and Philip Guston. The collection includes 92 works by Jasper Johns, 68 by Stephen Scott Young, and 87 by Andrew Wyeth. 

The GCMA is home to the largest and most complete collection of Wyeth watercolors owned by any public museum in the world. Andrew Wyeth himself wrote in a letter dated March 6, 1998, “The Greenville County Museum now has what I consider the very best collection of my watercolors in any public museum in this country”. By virtue of a tax millage, GCMA operations are supported by Greenville County, while program support comes from private sources.

In 2021, the museum sparked controversy when it deaccessioned the Alma Thomas painting Alma's Flower Garden, selling it in a private transaction to an unidentified buyer for $2.8 million.  The museum had purchased the painting in 2008 for $135,000.  Jonathan Walz, a curator of the upcoming national Alma Thomas exhibit in which the painting was to be included, said "It’s particularly important that Alma Thomas’ work, as the work of an African-American artist, be available for the public to see," and "If it has gone into a private collection, that’s devastating."  Arts writer Lee Rosenbaum criticized the sale as opaque, and depicted it, with similar sales by other museums, as a "professionally misguided strateg[y] of selling important works—among their highest-valued, by price, popularity and/or art historical importance—to reap the most money for current spending priorities, while leaving big holes in their collections."

Exhibitions
 Sundays at 2: Family Art Adventure – Mar 17, 2019
 Third Thursday Tour: Grainger McKoy – Mar 21, 2019
 Sundays at 2: Music in the Galleries – Mar 24, 2019
 Sundays at 2: Music in the Galleries – Mar 31, 2019
Andrew Stevovich: February 5, 2020 - March 17, 2020
Arnold Mesches: How Does Your Garden Grow? - March 27, 2019-September 15, 2019
William de Leftwich Dodge, James Earl, Howard White McLean, Ralph E. Earl, and Ben Shahn: Persons of Interest – February 28, 2019-September 15, 2019
Jasper Johns: More Than Meets the Eye – November 21, 2018-June 9, 2019
 Mike Solomon: Sentient – February 9, 2019-April 7, 2019
David Drake, Jasper Johns, William H. Johnson, and Grainger McKoy: Art and Artists of South Carolina – June 13, 2018-Present.

Visiting GMCA
Although Greenville County taxpayers support the museum's operations and building maintenance, no public funds are provided for art purchases. The Greenville County Museum of Art is open Wednesday through Saturday.

See also
List of museums in South Carolina

References

Art museums and galleries in South Carolina
Buildings and structures in Greenville, South Carolina
Museums in Greenville County, South Carolina
Museums of American art
Tourist attractions in Greenville, South Carolina